Double Decker is a British brand of chocolate bar currently manufactured by Cadbury. First introduced in the UK in 1976, its name derives from the well-known double-decker bus, with the buses themselves sometimes appearing in advertisements for the product. It is a mixture of milk chocolate, nougat, and crisp, crunchy cereal. 
This has proved to be a very popular recipe, being used in cakes and other confections.

Description

The chocolate bar is structured in two layers; a lightly-whipped nougat  layer, with a lower layer of cereal 'crispies', these are then coated in milk chocolate. Originally the bar contained raisins within the base layer; however, consumer research in the mid-1980s led to these being removed and the current formulation being introduced. Television adverts in the 1970s featured Willie Rushton before a mascot named Dougie the Double Decker Dog was introduced.

The bar has a mass of approximately 54.5g  although multipack bars are smaller at 37.3g. This increased from 42g in the 1970s and 51g in the 1980s, to a peak of 60g before attaining the current weight.  It typically contains 9.9g of fat, 38g of carbohydrates, 2.3g of protein and 1060kJ (250kcal) of energy.  The Double Decker no longer contains hydrogenated oil.  The bar is manufactured in Poland.

There also existed a 'Double Decker – Nuts' launched in 2004, which had the advertising slogan "crispy, crunchy, chewy and nutty". This chocolate bar was essentially a Double Decker with nuts contained within the nougat layer; however, it has since been discontinued. At the time it was distinctly aimed at males, and featured in Coronation Street credits during 2004.
In August 2016 Cadbury launched Dinky Deckers as part of the Bite Size bag range which are mini Cadbury Double Deckers available in a 120g pouch bag.

See also

 List of chocolate bar brands

References

Products introduced in 1976
Brand name confectionery
British confectionery
Cadbury brands
Chocolate bars
Mondelez International brands